Ivan Bernard Lund (13 May 1929 – 9 April 1992) was an Australian fencer. He competed at four Olympic Games. He was a longstanding member of the Melbourne-based VRI Fencing Club.

Achievements 
Ivan Lund competed in four Olympic Games. In 1952 in Helsinki, he competed in all individual and team competitions with the flute, sword and sabre, but did not reach the finals in any competition. Four years later in Melbourne he was eliminated with the Sword again in the preliminary round of the singles and with the team, also in 1960 in Rome in the Florett singles and with the Sword team. At the 1964 Summer Olympics in Tokyo, Lund, who was the flag bearer of the Australian delegation at the opening ceremony, competed individually and with the team with the floret and the sword. In all competitions he did not make it past the first round.

Lund won a total of 13 medals at the Commonwealth Games between 1950 and 1962, winning gold three times, twice in the Sword singles and once with the Sword team. He also won six silver medals and four bronze medals, of which he also won several with the floret and the sabre.

References

External links
 

1929 births
1992 deaths
Australian male épée fencers
Olympic fencers of Australia
Fencers at the 1952 Summer Olympics
Fencers at the 1956 Summer Olympics
Fencers at the 1960 Summer Olympics
Fencers at the 1964 Summer Olympics
Sportspeople from Melbourne
Fencers at the 1950 British Empire Games
Fencers at the 1954 British Empire and Commonwealth Games
Fencers at the 1958 British Empire and Commonwealth Games
Fencers at the 1962 British Empire and Commonwealth Games
Commonwealth Games medallists in fencing
Commonwealth Games gold medallists for Australia
Commonwealth Games silver medallists for Australia
Commonwealth Games bronze medallists for Australia
Australian male foil fencers
Australian male  sabre fencers
Sport Australia Hall of Fame inductees
20th-century Australian people
Medallists at the 1954 British Empire and Commonwealth Games
Medallists at the 1958 British Empire and Commonwealth Games
Medallists at the 1962 British Empire and Commonwealth Games